Sisi & I is a 2023 historical black comedy film written and directed by Frauke Finsterwalder and co-written by Christian Kracht, starring Susanne Wolff as Empress Elisabeth of Austria and Sandra Hüller as Countess Irma Sztáray. It tells a fictionalized story of Empress Elisabeth of Austria from the point of view of her lady-in-waiting, Irma Sztáray. The film is an international co-production between Germany, Switzerland and Austria. Sisi & I made its world premiere in the Panorama section of the 2023 Berlin Film Festival on 19 February 2023. It will be released theatrically in Austria by Panda Film, and in Germany and Switzerland by DCM on 30 March 2023.

Plot
The film tells the story of Empress Elisabeth of Austria from the point of view of her lady-in-waiting, Irma Sztáray, during a period in which the Empress was separated from her husband for many years and was surrounded only by other women, travelling throughout Europe, mastering six languages and practising high-performance sports.

Cast
 Susanne Wolff as Empress Elisabeth of Austria
 Sandra Hüller as Countess Irma Sztáray
 Tom Rhys Harries as Captain Smythe
 Stefan Kurt as Count Berzeviczy
 Johanna Wokalek as Countess Marie Festetics
 Angela Winkler as Princess Ludovika of Bavaria
 Georg Friedrich as Archduke Ludwig Viktor of Austria
 Annette Badland as Queen Victoria
 Anthony Calf as Charles Spencer, 6th Earl Spencer
 Markus Schleinzer as Franz Joseph I of Austria
 Sibylle Canonica as Maria Török de Szendrõ
 Tom Lass as Nicholas II of Russia
 Ravi Aujla as Doctor Bose
 Anne Müller as Baronin von Rothschildt
 Frank Böhm as Hungarian Doctor
 Alexander Korn as Diener
 William Erazo Fernández as Porter
 Sophie Hutter	as Fritzi

Production
On 5 November 2019, Screen International announced that German sales company The Match Factory would handle international sales on Frauke Finsterwalder's upcoming period drama, whose working title was Sisi – Kaiserin Elisabeth (Sisi – Empress Elisabeth in English), and that it would begin shooting in autumn 2020 in Germany, Switzerland, Ireland and Morocco. 

Finsterwalder co-wrote the screenplay with her husband, the bestselling Swiss author Christian Kracht. They had previously collaborated on Finsterwalder's first feature film, Finsterworld (2013), which starred Sandra Hüller, who plays Irma Sztáray in this film. It was reported that their screenplay would tell the story of Empress Elisabeth of Austria through the eyes of her lady-in-waiting in a period in which she was surrounded only by other women and separated from her husband for many years. Finsterwalder described it as "a feminist film full of biting dialogue, a gripping drama with elements of deep black comedy."

In the film's 2019 press release, Finsterwalder said:
Films should try to create new mythologies. Empress Elisabeth was a radical, intelligent and modern woman, far more so than the Sissi with the double S that we all know. She was simply born a century too early.

On 21 September 2020, the new working title was announced as Sisi und ich, and it was reported that Susanne Wolff and Sandra Hüller had been cast to play Elisabeth (aka Sisi) and Irma, respectively. Ella Rumpf, Stefan Kurt, Angela Winkler, Johannes Krisch, Maresi Riegner and Sophie Rois were also confirmed in the cast. The title was changed again in 2022 to Sisi & Ich (Sisi & I).

The film is a co-production between Germany's Walker + Worm Film, MMC Independent, Switzerland's C-Films and Austria's Dor Film. It was shot entirely on Super 16 mm film.

In an interview for Women and Hollywood in February 2023, Finsterwalder described the film as "a somewhat wild reinterpretation of the “Sisi” myth that isn’t really bothered by historical facts." When Finsterwalder started thinking about "Sisi" as a character, the 2019 documentary Leaving Neverland about Michael Jackson had just been released, and due to her personal experiences, the issue of the notion of grooming was central, and this is how she began the story of Countess Irma. "It is the aristotelian question: What is friendship? And why are friendships made? Out of sympathy? Out of love? Out of calculation? And what happens to friendship or love when the equilibrium of power is unbalanced?", Finsterwalder said.

Filming
Principal photography started on 20 September 2021 and wrapped on 15 November 2021. Filming took place in Germany, Bavaria, Vienna, Malta and Switzerland.

Marketing
The film's first official German poster was unveiled on 15 November 2022. A teaser trailer was released on 15 December 2022.

Three clips from the film were unveiled in February 2023.

Soundtrack
The film features songs by Nico, Le Tigre, Dory Previn, Portishead, Would-Be-Goods, Seagull Screaming Kiss Her Kiss Her, and others. Finsterwalder has said in interviews she only considered female voices for the soundtrack.

Release
The film was originally set to be released in Spring 2022. It made its world premiere at the 73rd Berlin International Film Festival on 19 February 2023. It was scheduled to be released theatrically in Germany and Switzerland by DCM on 16 March 2023, but the release date in both countries was pushed back to 30 March 2023. Panda Film will release the film in Austria on the same day. A companion book to the film featuring the entire screenplay, film stills, a behind the scenes look and a conversation between Frauke Finsterwalder and Christian Kracht will be published on 29 March 2023. 

The runtime announced in 2022 was 110 minutes. Shortly before the film's premiere at the 2023 Berlin Film Festival, the runtime announced on the festival's official website was 132 minutes.

Reception
Susanne Gottlieb of Cineuropa wrote: "Tackling the Sisi story from an entirely new perspective, Frauke Finsterwalder offers a thought-provoking and entertaining glance at the famous empress", "refraining from making her that sweet little girl from the Ernst Marischka films with Romy Schneider, and similarly steering clear of reimagining her as a feminist icon, as recent media projects have done, is a tactic that works wonders for the character."

Awards and nominations

References

External links 
 
 
 Sisi & I at Cineuropa
 Sisi & I on DCM Stories

2023 films
2023 drama films
2020s German films
2020s German-language films
2020s biographical drama films
2020s historical drama films
2020s feminist films
2020s black comedy films
German biographical drama films
German historical drama films
Austrian biographical drama films
Austrian historical drama films
Swiss biographical drama films
Swiss historical drama films
Cultural depictions of Empress Elisabeth of Austria
Cultural depictions of Franz Joseph I of Austria
Cultural depictions of Nicholas II of Russia
Cultural depictions of Queen Victoria on film
Biographical films about Austrian royalty
Films set in Austria
Films set in Vienna
Films set in the 19th century
Films about the upper class
Films set in the Austrian Empire
Films set in the Kingdom of Bavaria
Films shot in Vienna
Films shot in Bavaria
Films shot in Malta
Films shot in Switzerland
2023 LGBT-related films
German LGBT-related films
Austrian LGBT-related films
Swiss LGBT-related films
LGBT-related biographical films
LGBT-related drama films
German multilingual films
Austrian multilingual films
Swiss multilingual films